Electrical impedance tomography (EIT) is a noninvasive type of medical imaging in which the electrical conductivity, permittivity, and impedance of a part of the body is inferred from surface electrode measurements and used to form a tomographic image of that part. Electrical conductivity varies considerably among various biological tissues (absolute EIT) or the movement of fluids and gases within tissues (difference EIT). The majority of EIT systems apply small alternating currents at a single frequency, however, some EIT systems use multiple frequencies to better differentiate between normal and suspected abnormal tissue within the same organ (multifrequency-EIT or electrical impedance spectroscopy).

Typically, conducting surface electrodes are attached to the skin around the body part being examined. Small alternating currents will be applied to some or all of the electrodes, the resulting equi-potentials being recorded from the other electrodes (figures 1 and 2). This process will then be repeated for numerous different electrode configurations and finally result in a two-dimensional tomogram according to the image reconstruction algorithms incorporated.

Since free ion content determines tissue and fluid conductivity, muscle and blood will conduct the applied currents better than fat, bone or lung tissue. This property can be used to reconstruct static images by morphological or absolute EIT (a-EIT). However, in contrast to linear x-rays used in Computed Tomography, electric currents travel three dimensionally along all the paths simultaneously, weighted by their conductivity (thus primarily along the path of least resistivity, but not exclusively). This means, that a part of the electric current leaves the transverse plane and results in an impedance transfer. This and other factors are the reason why image reconstruction in absolute EIT is so hard, since there is usually more than just one solution for image reconstruction of a three-dimensional area projected onto a two-dimensional plane.

Mathematically, the problem of recovering conductivity from surface measurements of current and potential is a non-linear inverse problem and is severely ill-posed. The mathematical formulation of the problem is due to Alberto Calderón, and in the mathematical literature of inverse problems it is often referred to as "Calderón's inverse problem" or the "Calderón problem". There is extensive mathematical research on the problem of uniqueness of solution and numerical algorithms for this problem.

Compared to the tissue conductivities of most other soft tissues within the human thorax, lung tissue conductivity is approximately five-fold lower, resulting in high absolute contrast. This characteristic may partially explain the amount of research conducted in EIT lung imaging. Furthermore, lung conductivity fluctuates intensely during the breath cycle which accounts for the immense interest of the research community to use EIT as a bedside method to visualize inhomogeneity of lung ventilation in mechanically ventilated patients. EIT measurements between two or more physiological states, e.g. between inspiration and expiration, are therefore referred to as time difference EIT (td-EIT).

Time difference EIT (td-EIT) has one major advantage over absolute EIT (a-EIT): inaccuracies resulting from interindividual anatomy, insufficient skin contact of surface electrodes or impedance transfer can be dismissed because most artifacts will eliminate themselves due to simple image subtraction in f-EIT. This is most likely the reason why, as of today, the greatest progress of EIT research has been achieved with difference EIT.

Further EIT applications proposed include detection/location of cancer in skin, breast, or cervix, localization of epileptic foci, imaging of brain activity. as well as a diagnostic tool for impaired gastric emptying. Attempts to detect or localize tissue pathology within normal tissue usually rely on multifrequency EIT (MF-EIT), also termed Electrical Impedance Spectroscopy (EIS) and are based on differences in conductance patterns at varying frequencies.

History
The invention of EIT as a medical imaging technique is usually attributed to John G. Webster and a publication in 1978, although the first practical realization of a medical EIT system was detailed in 1984 due to the work of David C. Barber and Brian H. Brown. Together, Brown and Barber published the first Electrical Impedance Tomogram in 1983, visualizing the cross section of a human forearm by absolute EIT. Even though there has been substantial progress in the meantime, most a-EIT applications are still considered experimental. However, two commercial f-EIT devices for monitoring lung function in intensive care patients have been introduced just recently.

A technique similar to EIT is used in geophysics and industrial process monitoring – electrical resistivity tomography. In analogy to EIT, surface electrodes are being placed on the earth, within bore holes, or within a vessel or pipe in order to locate resistivity anomalies or monitor mixtures of conductive fluids. Setup and reconstruction techniques are comparable to EIT. In geophysics, the idea dates from the 1930s. Electrical resistivity tomography has also been proposed for mapping the electrical properties of substrates and thin films for electronic applications.

Theory

Electrical conductivity and permittivity vary among biological tissue types and depend on their free ion content. Further factors affecting conductivity include temperature and other physiological factors, e.g. the respiratory cycle between in- and expiration when lung tissue becomes more conductive due to lower content of insulating air within its alveoli.

After positioning surface electrodes through adhesive electrodes, an electrode belt or a conductive electrode vest around the body part of interest, alternating currents of typically a few milliamperes at a frequency of 10–100 kHz will be applied across two or more drive electrodes. The remaining electrodes will be used to measure the resulting voltage. The procedure will then be repeated for numerous "stimulation patterns", e.g. successive pairs of adjacent electrodes until an entire circle has been completed and image reconstruction can be carried out and displayed by a digital workstation that incorporates complex mathematical algorithms and a priori data.

The current itself is applied using current sources, either a single current source switched between electrodes using a multiplexer or a system of voltage-to-current converters, one for each electrode, each controlled by a digital-to-analog converter.  The measurements again may be taken either by a single voltage measurement circuit multiplexed over the electrodes or a separate circuit for each electrode. Earlier EIT systems still used an analog demodulation circuit to convert the alternating voltage to a direct current level before running it through an analog-to-digital converter. Newer systems convert the alternating signal directly before performing digital demodulation. Depending on indication, some EIT systems are capable of working at multiple frequencies and measuring both magnitude and phase of the voltage. Voltages measured are passed on to a computer to perform image reconstruction and display. The choice of current (or voltage) patterns affects the signal-to-noise ratio significantly. With devices capable of feeding currents from all electrodes simultaneously (such as ACT3) it is possible to adaptively determine optimal current patterns.

If images are to be displayed in real time a typical approach is the application of some form of regularized inverse of a linearization of the forward problem or a fast version of a direct reconstruction method such as the D-bar method. Most practical systems used in the medical environment generate a 'difference image', i.e. differences in voltage between two time points are left-multiplied by the regularized inverse to calculate an approximate difference between permittivity and conductivity images. Another approach is to construct a finite element model of the body and adjust the conductivities (for example using a variant of Levenburg–Marquart method) to fit the measured data. This is more challenging as it requires an accurate body shape and the exact position of the electrodes.

Much of the fundamental work underpinning Electrical Impedance was done at Rensselaer Polytechnic Institute starting in the 1980s. See also the work published in 1992 from the Glenfield Hospital Project (reference missing).

Absolute EIT approaches are targeted at digital reconstruction of static images, i.e. two-dimensional representations of the anatomy within the body part of interest. As mentioned above and unlike linear x-rays in Computed Tomography, electric currents travel three-dimensionally along the path of least resistivity (figure 1), which results in partial loss of the electric current applied (impedance transfer, e.g. due to blood flow through the transverse plane). This is one of the reasons why image reconstruction in absolute EIT is so complex, since there is usually more than just one solution for image reconstruction of a three-dimensional area projected onto a two-dimensional plane. Another difficulty is that given the number of electrodes and the measurement precision at each electrode, only objects bigger than a given size can be distinguished. This explains the necessity of highly sophisticated mathematical algorithms that will address the inverse problem and its ill-posedness.

Further difficulties in absolute EIT arise from inter- and intra-individual differences of electrode conductivity with associated image distortion and artifacts. It is also important to bear in mind that the body part of interest is rarely precisely rotund and that inter-individual anatomy varies, e.g. thorax shape, affecting individual electrode spacing. A priori data accounting for age-, height- and gender-typical anatomy can reduce sensitivity to artifacts and image distortion. Improving the signal-to-noise ratio, e.g. by using active surface electrodes, further reduces imaging errors. Some of the latest EIT systems with active electrodes monitor electrode performance through an extra channel and are able to compensate for insufficient skin contact by removing them from the measurements. Another potential solution to problem with electrode-skin contact is contactless EIT technique which uses voltage excitation and capacitive coupling instead of direct contact with the skin. Capacitively coupled electrodes are more comfortable for the patient but maintaining a constant and equal coupling capacitance for all electrodes is challenging in real measurements. 

Time difference EIT bypasses most of these issues by recording measurements in the same individual between two or more physiological states associated with linear conductivity changes. One of the best examples for this approach is lung tissue during breathing due to linear conductivity changes between inspiration and expiration which are caused by varying contents of insulating air during each breath cycle. This permits digital subtraction of recorded measurements obtained during the breath cycle and results in functional images of lung ventilation. One major advantage is that relative changes of conductivity remain comparable between measurements even if one of the recording electrodes is less conductive than the others, thereby reducing most artifacts and image distortions. However, incorporating a priori data sets or meshes in difference EIT is still useful in order to project images onto the most likely organ morphology, which depends on weight, height, gender, and other individual factors.

The open source project  EIDORS
provides a suite of programs (written in Matlab / GNU Octave) for data reconstruction and display under the GNU GPL license.

The Open Innovation EIT Research Initiative is aimed at advancing the development of electrical impedance tomography (EIT) in general and to ultimately accelerate its clinical adoption. A plug-and-play EIT hardware and software package is available through Swisstom and can be acquired at net cost price. Image reconstruction and processing of raw data obtained with this set can be carried out without any limitations by the software tools provided through EIDORS.

Properties
In contrast to most other tomographic imaging techniques, EIT does not apply any kind of ionizing radiation. Currents typically applied in EIT are relatively small and certainly below the threshold at which they would cause significant nerve stimulation. The frequency of the alternating current is sufficiently high not to give rise to electrolytic effects in the body and the Ohmic power dissipated is sufficiently small and diffused over the body to be easily handled by the body's thermoregulatory system. These properties qualify EIT to be continuously applied in humans, e.g. during mechanical ventilation in an intensive care unit (ICU).
Because the equipment needed in order to perform EIT is much smaller and less costly than in conventional tomography, EIT qualifies for continuous real time visualization of lung ventilation right at the bedside.
EIT's major disadvantage versus conventional tomography is its lower maximum spatial resolution (approximately 15% of electrode array diameter in EIT compared to 1 mm in CT and MRI). However, resolution can be improved using 32 instead of 16 electrodes. Image quality can be further improved by constructing an EIT system with active surface electrodes, which significantly reduce signal loss, artifacts, and interferences associated with cables as well as cable length and handling.
In contrast to spatial resolution, temporal resolution of EIT (0.1 milliseconds) is much higher than in CT or MRI (0.1 seconds).

Applications

Lung (a-EIT, td-EIT)
EIT is particularly useful for monitoring lung function because lung tissue resistivity is five times higher than most other soft tissues in the thorax. This results in high absolute contrast of the lungs. In addition, lung resistivity increases and decreases several-fold between inspiration and expiration which explains why monitoring ventilation is currently the most promising clinical application of EIT since mechanical ventilation frequently results in ventilator-associated lung injury (VALI). The feasibility of EIT for lung imaging was first demonstrated at Rensselaer Polytechnic Institute in 1990 using the NOSER algorithm. Time difference EIT can resolve the changes in the distribution of lung volumes between dependent and non-dependent lung regions and assist in adjusting ventilator settings to provide lung protective ventilation to patients during critical illness or anesthesia.

Most EIT studies have focused on monitoring regional lung function using the information determined by time difference EIT (td-EIT). However absolute EIT (a-EIT) also has the potential to become a clinically useful tool for lung imaging, as this approach would allow one to directly distinguish between lung conditions which result from regions with lower resistivity (e.g. hemothorax, pleural effusion, atelectasis, lung edema) and those with higher resistivity (e.g. pneumothorax, emphysema).

The above image shows an EIT study of a 10-day-old baby breathing normally with 16 adhesive electrodes applied to the chest.

Image reconstruction from absolute impedance measurements requires consideration of the exact dimensions and shape of a body as well as the precise electrode location since simplified assumptions would lead to major reconstruction artifacts. While initial studies assessing aspects of absolute EIT have been published, this area of research has not yet reached the level of maturity which would make it suitable for clinical use.

In contrast, time difference EIT determines relative impedance changes that may be caused by either ventilation or changes of end-expiratory lung volume. These relative changes are referred to a baseline level, which is typically defined by the intra-thoracic impedance distribution at the end of expiration.
Time difference EIT images can be generated continuously and right at the bedside. These attributes make regional lung function monitoring particularly useful whenever there is a need to improve oxygenation or CO2 elimination and when therapy changes are intended to achieve a more homogenous gas distribution in mechanically ventilated patients. EIT lung imaging can resolve the changes in the regional distribution of lung volumes between e.g. dependent and non-dependent lung regions as ventilator parameters are changed. Thus, EIT measurements may be used to guide specific ventilator settings to maintain lung protective ventilation for each patient.

Besides the applicability of EIT in the ICU, first studies with spontaneously breathing patients reveal further promising applications. The high temporal resolution of EIT allows regional assessment of common dynamic parameters used in pulmonary function testing (e.g. forced expiratory volume in 1 second). Additionally, specially developed image fusion methods overlaying functional EIT-data with morphological patient data (e.g. CT or MRI images) may be used to get a comprehensive insight into the pathophysiology of the lungs, which might be useful for patients with obstructive lung diseases (e.g. COPD, CF).

After many years of lung EIT research with provisional EIT equipment or series models manufactured in very small numbers, two commercial systems for lung EIT have recently entered the medical technology market: Dräger's PulmoVista® 500 and Swisstom AG's Swisstom BB2. Both models are currently being installed in intensive care units and are already used as aides in decision-making processes related to the treatment of patients with acute respiratory distress syndrome (ARDS).

The increasing availability of commercial EIT systems in ICUs will show whether the promising body of evidence obtained from animal models will apply to humans as well (EIT-guided lung recruitment, selection of optimum PEEP levels, pneumothorax detection, prevention of ventilator associated lung injury (VALI), etc.). This would be highly desirable, given that recent studies suggest that 15% of mechanically ventilated patients in the ICU will develop acute lung injury (ALI) with attendant progressive lung collapse and which is associated with a reportedly high mortality of 39%. Just recently, the first prospective animal trial on EIT-guided mechanical ventilation and outcome could demonstrate significant benefits in regard to respiratory mechanics, gas exchange, and histological signs of ventilator-associated lung injury.

In addition to visual information (e.g. regional distribution of tidal volume), EIT measurements provide raw data sets that can be used to calculate other helpful information (e.g. changes of intrathoracal gas volume during critical illness) – however, such parameters still require careful evaluation and validation.

Another interesting aspect of thoracic EIT is its ability to record and filter pulsatile signals of perfusion. Although promising studies have been published on this topic, this technology is still at its beginnings. A breakthrough would allow simultaneous visualization of both regional blood flow and regional ventilation – enabling clinicians to locate and react upon physiological shunts caused by regional mismatches of lung ventilation and perfusion with associated hypoxemia.

Breast (MF-EIT)
EIT is being investigated in the field of breast imaging as an alternative/complementary technique to mammography and magnetic resonance imaging (MRI) for breast cancer detection. The low specificity of mammography  and of MRI  result in a relatively high rate of false positive screenings, with high distress for patients and cost for healthcare structures. Development of alternative imaging techniques for this indication would be desirable due to the shortcomings of the existing methods: ionizing radiation in mammography and the risk of inducing nephrogenic systemic fibrosis (NSF) in patients with decreased renal function by administering the contrast agent used in breast MRI, Gadolinium.

Literature shows that the electrical properties differ between normal and malignant
breast tissues, setting the stage for cancer detection through determination of electrical properties.

An early commercial development of non-tomographic electrical impedance imaging was the T-Scan device  which was reported to improve sensitivity and specificity when used as an adjunct to screening mammography. A report to the United States Food and Drug Administration (FDA) describes a study involving 504 subjects where the sensitivity of mammography was 82%, 62% for the T-Scan alone, and 88% for the two combined. The specificity was 39% for mammography, 47% for the T-Scan alone, and 51% for the two combined.

Several research groups across the world are actively developing the technique. A frequency sweep seems to be an effective technique for detecting breast cancer using EIT.

United States Patent US 8,200,309 B2 combines electrical impedance scanning with magnetic resonance low frequency current density imaging in a clinically acceptable configuration not requiring the use of gadolinium chelate enhancement in magnetic resonance mammography.

Cervix (MF-EIT)
In addition to his pioneering role in the development of the first EIT systems in Sheffield professor Brian H. Brown is currently active in the research and development of an electrical impedance spectroscope based on MF-EIT. According to a study published by Brown in 2000, MF-EIT is able to predict [Cervical intraepithelial neoplasia] (CIN) grades 2 and 3 according to Pap smear with a sensitivity and specificity of 92% each. Whether cervical MF-EIT is going to be introduced as an adjunct or an alternative to the Pap smear has yet to be decided. Brown is academic founder of Zilico Limited which distributes the spectroscope (ZedScan I). The device received EC certification from its Notified Body in 2013 and is currently being introduced into a number of clinics in the UK and healthcare systems across the globe.

Brain (a-EIT, td-EIT, mf-EIT)
EIT has been suggested as a basis for brain imaging to enable detection and monitoring of cerebral ischemia, haemorrhage, and other morphological pathologies associated with impedance changes due to neuronal cell swelling, i.e. cerebral hypoxemia and hypoglycemia.

While EIT's maximum spatial resolution of approximately 15% of the electrode array diameter is significantly lower than that of cerebral CT or MRI (about one millimeter), temporal resolution of EIT is much higher than in CT or MRI (0.1 milliseconds compared to 0.1 seconds). This makes EIT also interesting for monitoring normal brain function and neuronal activity in intensive care units or the preoperative setting for localization of epileptic foci by telemetric recordings.

Holder was able to demonstrate in 1992 that changes of intracerebral impedance can be detected noninvasively through the cranium by surface electrode measurements. Animal models of experimental stroke or seizure showed increases of impedance of up to 100% and 10%, respectively.
More recent EIT systems offer the option to apply alternating currents from non-adjacent drive electrodes. So far, cerebral EIT has not yet reached the maturity to be adopted in clinical routine, yet clinical studies are currently being performed on stroke and epilepsy.

In this use EIT depends upon applying low frequency currents above the skull that are around <100 Hz since during neuronal rest at this frequency these currents remain in the extracellular space and therefore unable to enter the intracellular space within neurons. However, when a neuron generates an action potential or is about to be depolarized, resistance of its membrane preventing this will be reduced by eighty-fold. Whenever this happens in a larger numbers of neurons, resistivity changes of about 0.06–1.7 % will result. These changes in resistivity provide a means of detecting coherent neuronal activity across larger numbers of neurons and so the tomographic imaging of neural brain activity.

Unfortunately while such changes are detectable "they are just too small to support reliable production of images." The prospects of using this technique for this indication will depend upon improved signal processing or recording.

A study reported in June 2011 that Functional Electrical Impedance Tomography by Evoke Response (fEITER) has been used to image changes in brain activity after injection of an anaesthetic. One of the benefits of the technique is that the equipment required is small enough and easy enough to transport so that it can be used for monitoring depth of anesthesia in operating theatres.

Perfusion (td-EIT)
Due to its relatively high conductivity, blood may be used for functional imaging of perfusion in tissues and organs characterized by lower conductivities, e.g. to visualize regional lung perfusion. Background of this approach is that pulsatile tissue impedance changes according to differences in the filling of blood vessels between systole and diastole, particularly when injecting saline as contrasting agent.

Sports medicine / home care (a-EIT, td-EIT)
Electrical impedance measurements may also be used to calculate abstract parameters, i.e. nonvisual information. Recent advances in EIT technology as well as the lower number of electrodes required for recording global instead of regional parameters in healthy individuals can be used for non-invasive determination of e.g. VO2  or arterial blood pressure in sports medicine or home care.

Commercial systems

a-EIT and td-EIT
Even though medical EIT systems had not been used broadly until recently, several medical equipment manufacturers have been supplying commercial versions of lung imaging systems developed by university research groups. The first such system is produced by Maltron International who distribute the Sheffield Mark 3.5 system with 16 electrodes. Similar systems are the Goe MF II system developed by the University of Göttingen, Germany and distributed through CareFusion (16 electrodes) as well as the Enlight 1800 developed at the University of São Paulo School of Medicine and the Polytechnic Institute of the University of São Paulo, Brazil which is distributed by Timpel SA (32 electrodes). 
These systems typically comply with medical safety legislation and have been primarily employed by clinical research groups in hospitals, most of them in critical care.

The first EIT device for lung function monitoring designed for everyday clinical use in the critical care environment has been made available by Dräger Medical in 2011 – the PulmoVista® 500 (16-electrode system). Another commercial EIT system designed for monitoring lung function in the ICU setting is based on 32 active electrodes and was first presented at 2013's annual ESICM congress – the Swisstom BB2. In the meantime, Swisstom AG's Swisstom’s BB2 has been released to the market at 2014's International Symposium on Intensive Care and Emergency Medicine (ISICEM) and will be distributed in Western Europe through a partnership between Swisstom and Maquet.

MF-EIT
Multifrequency-EIT (MF-EIT) or electrical impedance spectroscopy (EIS) systems are typically designed to detect or locate abnormal tissue, e.g. precancerous lesions or cancer. 
Impedance Medical Technologies manufacture systems based on designs by the Research Institute of Radioengineering and Electronics of the Russian Academy of Science in Moscow, that are aimed especially at breast cancer detection. 
Texas-based Mirabel Medical Systems, Inc. develops a similar solution for non-invasive detection of breast cancer and offers the T-Scan 2000ED. Zilico Limited distributes an electrical impedance spectroscope named ZedScan I as a medical device supposed to aid cervical intraepithelial neoplasia location/diagnosis.  The device just received EC certification in 2013.

V5R
The v5r is a high performance device, based upon a voltage-voltage measurement technique, designed to improve process control. The high frame rate of the v5r (over 650 frames per second) means that it can be used to monitor rapidly evolving processes or dynamic flow conditions.  The data it provides can be used to determine the flow profile of complex multiphase processes; allowing engineers to discriminate between laminar flow, plug flow and other important flow conditions for deeper understanding and improved process control.

When used for concentration measurements, the ability to measure full impedance across a wide range of phase ratios means the v5r is able to deliver considerable accuracy across a wider conductivity range compared to other devices.

See also
 Electrical capacitance volume tomography
 Electrical capacitance tomography
 Respiratory monitoring
 EIDORS a reconstruction toolbox for EIT
 Industrial Tomography Systems

References

Electrodiagnosis
Impedance measurements
Inverse problems
Medical imaging